Wingo is a surname. Notable people with the surname include:

Ajume Wingo, Cameroonian political and social philosopher
Al Wingo (1898–1964), American baseball player
Blair Wingo (born 1984), model, actress, and Christian spoken word artist
Donnie Wingo (born 1960), NASCAR crew chief
Ed Wingo (1895–1964), Canadian baseball player
Effiegene Locke Wingo (1883–1962), U.S. Representative from Arkansas
Harthorne Wingo (born 1947), American basketball player
Henry Wingo, American soccer player
Ivey Wingo (1890–1941), American baseball player
Otis Wingo (1877–1930), U.S. Representative from Arkansas's 4th congressional district
Plennie L. Wingo (1895–1993), walked backwards from Santa Monica, California to Istanbul, Turkey
Rich Wingo (born 1956), American football player
Scott Wingo (born 1989), American baseball player
Trey Wingo (born 1963), sports broadcaster

See also 
Vingoe, surname of Cornish origin